Kansas Township is located in Woodford County, Illinois. As of the 2010 census, its population was 433 and it contained 172 housing units. Kansas Township formed from Palestine Township in September, 1859.

Geography

Demographics

References

External links
City-data.com
Illinois State Archives

Townships in Woodford County, Illinois
Peoria metropolitan area, Illinois
Townships in Illinois